Punam Ganesh Raut (born 14 October 1989), sometimes spelt Poonam Raut, is an Indian cricketer who plays for the Indian women's national team.

Career
On 15 May 2017, in an ODI verses Ireland, Raut set a world record opening partnership of 320 runs with Deepti Sharma, contributing 109. This beat both the standing women's record of 229 (by Sarah Taylor and Caroline Atkins of England) and the standing men's record in ODIs of 286 (by Upul Tharanga and Sanath Jayasuriya of Sri Lanka).

Poonam Raut was part of the Indian team to reach the final of the 2017 Women's Cricket World Cup where the team lost to England by nine runs.

In May 2021, she was named in India's Test squad for their one-off match against the England women's cricket team.

International centuries

Test centuries

One Day International centuries

See also 
 List of centuries in women's One Day International cricket
 List of centuries in women's Test cricket

References

External links
 
 

1989 births
Living people
Central Zone women cricketers
Cricketers from Mumbai
India women Test cricketers
India women One Day International cricketers
India women Twenty20 International cricketers
Mumbai women cricketers
Railways women cricketers
West Zone women cricketers
IPL Trailblazers cricketers